is a newscaster in Japan, and a former Nihon Terebi announcer.

References

Living people
People from Nara, Nara
1968 births
Japanese broadcast news analysts